The 1998 Australian Formula Ford Championship was a CAMS sanctioned Australian motor racing title for drivers of Formula Ford racing cars. The title, which was the sixth Australian Formula Ford Championship, was won by Adam Macrow driving a Spectrum 06.

Calendar
The championship was contested over an eight round series with two races per round.

Points system
Championship points were awarded on a 20-16-14-12-10-8-6-4-2-1 basis to the first ten finishers in each race.

Results

Note: Each car was required to use a Ford 1600cc crossflow engine.

Note: Only half points were awarded for Race 2 of Round 8 as the race was stopped prematurely due to an accident.

References

External links
 1998 AFFC Entry List Retrieved from members.ozemail.com.au on 26 June 2009
 1998 AFFC Media Releases (including round reports) Retrieved from members.ozemail.com.au on 26 June 2009
  Image of the Champion – Adam Macrow competing in the 1998 AFFC Retrieved from web.archive.org/web on 26 June 2009

Australian Formula Ford Championship seasons
Formula Ford Championship